The Yapola, also known as the Wanla River, is a river near Khalsi. It flows into the Indus River near Lamayuru.

References 

Rivers of Jammu and Kashmir
Tributaries of the Indus River
Geography of Ladakh
Rivers of India